The 2019 Macau Open was a badminton tournament which took place at Tap Seac Multisport Pavilion Macau in Macau from 29 October to 3 November 2019 and had a total prize of $150,000.

Tournament
The 2019 Macau Open was the twenty-second tournament of the 2019 BWF World Tour and also part of the Macau Open championships, which had been held since 2006. This tournament was organized by Badminton Federation of Macau and sanctioned by the BWF.

Venue
This international tournament was held at Tap Seac Multisport Pavilion Macau in Macau.

Point distribution
Below is the point distribution table for each phase of the tournament based on the BWF points system for the BWF World Tour Super 300 event.

Prize money
The total prize money for this tournament was US$150,000. Distribution of prize money was in accordance with BWF regulations.

Men's singles

Seeds

 Shi Yuqi (final)
 Son Wan-ho (second round)
 Kantaphon Wangcharoen (semi-finals)
 Sameer Verma (withdrew)
 Sitthikom Thammasin (champion)
 Lee Cheuk Yiu (first round)
 Khosit Phetpradab (withdrew)
 Liew Daren (first round)

Finals

Top half

Section 1

Section 2

Bottom half

Section 3

Section 4

Women's singles

Seeds

 Michelle Li (champion)
 Sung Ji-hyun (first round)
 Han Yue (final)
 Zhang Beiwen (second round)
 Busanan Ongbamrungphan (quarter-finals)
 Cai Yanyan (quarter-finals)
 An Se-young (withdrew)
 Kim Ga-eun (semi-finals)

Finals

Top half

Section 1

Section 2

Bottom half

Section 3

Section 4

Men's doubles

Seeds

 Li Junhui / Liu Yuchen (champions)
 Lee Yang / Wang Chi-lin (quarter-finals)
 Liao Min-chun / Su Ching-heng (second round)
 Lu Ching-yao / Yang Po-han (quarter-finals)
 Kim Gi-jung / Lee Yong-dae (withdrew)
 Goh Sze Fei / Nur Izzuddin Mohd Rumsani (semi-finals)
 Lee Jhe-huei / Yang Po-hsuan (quarter-finals)
 Huang Kaixiang / Liu Cheng (final)

Finals

Top half

Section 1

Section 2

Bottom half

Section 3

Section 4

Women's doubles

Seeds

 Du Yue / Li Yinhui (champions)
 Jongkolphan Kititharakul / Rawinda Prajongjai (final)
 Li Wenmei / Zheng Yu (semi-finals)
 Della Destiara Haris / Rizki Amelia Pradipta (semi-finals)
 Émilie Lefel / Anne Tran (withdrew)
 Setyana Mapasa / Gronya Somerville (second round)
 Hsu Ya-ching / Hu Ling-fang (second round)
 Meghana Jakkampudi / Poorvisha S. Ram (first round)

Finals

Top half

Section 1

Section 2

Bottom half

Section 3

Section 4

Mixed doubles

Seeds

 Dechapol Puavaranukroh / Sapsiree Taerattanachai (champions)
 Praveen Jordan / Melati Daeva Oktavianti (withdrew)
 Hafiz Faizal / Gloria Emanuelle Widjaja  (quarter-finals)
 Tang Chun Man / Tse Ying Suet (quarter-finals)
 Lee Jhe-huei / Hsu Ya-ching (quarter-finals)
 Wang Chi-lin / Cheng Chi-ya (final)
 Chang Tak Ching / Ng Wing Yung (first round)
 Hoo Pang Ron / Cheah Yee See (semi-finals)

Finals

Top half

Section 1

Section 2

Bottom half

Section 3

Section 4

References

External links
 Official Website 
 Tournament Link

Macau Open Badminton Championships
Macau Open (badminton)
Macau Open (badminton)
Macau Open (badminton)
Macau Open (badminton)